The 2014 Limerick Senior Hurling Championship was the 120th staging of the Limerick Senior Hurling Championship since its establishment by the Limerick County Board in 1887. The championship began on 2 May 2014 and ended on 19 October 2014.

Na Piarsaigh were the defending champions. However, they were defeated in the final by Kilmallock, who won by 1-15 to 0-14. Na Piarsaigh had earlier defeated Kilmallock in the group stage. Knockainey and Granagh-Ballingarry were relegated from the championship.

Teams

Overview

A major restructuring of the Limerick Senior Hurling Championship at the end of 2013 resulted in the number of participating teams for 2014 being reduced from sixteen to twelve. Because of this Garryspillane, Bruree, Hospital-Herbertstown and Croom regraded to the newly created Limerick Premier Intermediate Hurling Championship for 2014.

Results

Group 1

Group 2

Quarter-finals

Semi-final

Final

External links

 2014 Limerick Senior Hurling Championship Group 1 results
 2014 Limerick Senior Hurling Championship Group 2 results

References

Limerick Senior Hurling Championship
Limerick Senior Hurling Championship